White basswood is a common name for several flowering plants and may refer to:

Polyscias murrayi, native to eastern Australia
Tilia heterophylla, native to eastern North America